Matilda Elisabeth Ernkrans (born 12 March 1973) is a Swedish politician of the Social Democratic Party. She served as Minister for International Development Cooperation from 2021 to 2022 and previously served as Minister for Higher Education and Research January 2019 to November 2021. She has been a member of the Riksdag since 2006 and a replacement member of the Riksdag from 2002 to 2006.

Early life and education 
Erknkrans was born in Hallsberg.

Political career 
In 2002, Ernkrans was elected to the Riksdag, from Örebro County. From 2004 to 2006, she was a member of the Committee on Cultural Affairs. From 2006 to 2010, she was a member of the Committee on Social Insurance. From 2010–2018, she was chair of the Committee on Environment and Agriculture. In 2018, she was chair of the Committee on Education.

Other activities 
 Multilateral Investment Guarantee Agency (MIGA), World Bank Group, Ex-Officio Alternate Member of the Board of Governors (2021–2022)
 World Bank, Ex-Officio Alternate Member of the Board of Governors (2021–2022)

References

External links 

Matilda Ernkran at the Riksdag website

1973 births
Living people
People from Hallsberg Municipality
Members of the Riksdag from the Social Democrats
Women government ministers of Sweden
Members of the Riksdag 2002–2006
Women members of the Riksdag
21st-century Swedish women politicians
Örebro University alumni
Swedish Ministers for International Development Cooperation
Members of the Riksdag 2006–2010
Members of the Riksdag 2010–2014
Members of the Riksdag 2014–2018
Members of the Riksdag 2018–2022
Members of the Riksdag 2022–2026